UN Watch is a Geneva-based non-governmental organization whose stated mission is "to monitor the performance of the United Nations by the yardstick of its own Charter". It is an accredited NGO in Special Consultative Status to the UN Economic and Social Council and an Associate NGO to the UN Department of Public Information.

UN Watch has been active in combating human rights abuses in Democratic Republic of the Congo and Darfur, and has been vocal against abuses in regimes such as China, Cuba, Russia and Venezuela, often using its allotted time at the UNHRC to allow for dissidents and human rights activists to speak. UN Watch is frequently critical of what it views as anti-Israel and antisemitic sentiment at the UN and UN-sponsored events.

The group has been praised by former UN Secretary General Kofi Annan, and the Director General of the UN Office in Geneva Sergei Ordzhonikidze has acknowledged "the valuable work of UN Watch in support of the just application of values and principles of the United Nations Charter and support for human rights for all." Agence France-Presse has described UN Watch both as "a lobby group with strong ties to Israel" and as a group which "champion[s] human rights worldwide".

Founding
UN Watch was founded in 1993 under the chairmanship of Morris B. Abram. Abram served as the Chairman of the United Negro College Fund and President of Brandeis University. Abram was active in community affairs as President of the American Jewish Committee (1963–1968); Chairman of the National Coalition Supporting Soviet Jewry (1983–1988); and Chairman of the Conference of Presidents of Major American Jewish Organizations (1986–1989).

Abram supported the UN as an institution. In 1999, Abram delivered a speech to the U.S. Congress on the subject of the treatment of Israel by the United Nations in which he said "UN Watch categorically supports the UN as an indispensable institution. The US should pay its past dues to the UN as a matter of national honor and in recognition of the UN's importance. In spite of the UN's flaws, it is inconceivable that the US withhold support from the only truly global organization in such an interdependent world."

After Abram died in 2000, David A. Harris, Executive Director of the American Jewish Committee, was elected Chairman of UN Watch.

In 2001, Harris announced that UN Watch had become a wholly owned subsidiary of the American Jewish Committee. According to a press release at the time, “UN Watch was established with the generous assistance of Edgar Bronfman, President of the World Jewish Congress. Eighteen months ago, the American Jewish Committee and the World Jewish Congress reached an agreement, approved by the international board of UN Watch, to transfer full control of the organization to AJC, an agreement that went into effect on January 1, 2001.”

Since 2013, UN Watch claimed it is no longer affiliated with AJC and is an independent organization.

Structure and status
UN Watch participates at the UN as an accredited NGO in Special Consultative Status to the UN Economic and Social Council (ECOSOC) and as an Associate NGO to the UN Department of Public Information (DPI). It is affiliated with the American Jewish Committee, a NGO established in 1906, which was a pioneer advocate of the UN Charter's inclusion of international human rights guarantees, and the creation of the post of a High Commissioner of Human Rights.

UN Watch has participated in the following UN activities: the Commission on Human Rights, a Panel Discussion on the United Nations and the Middle East, a Panel Discussion on Proposals to Reform the Commission on Human Rights, the Sub-Commission for the Promotion and Protection of Human Rights, the Committee on the Elimination of Racial Discrimination, and the Working Group on Minorities. A UN Watch seminar in Geneva featured a tour of the Palais des Nations, a visit to the International Red Cross and Red Crescent Museum, and attendance at a meeting of the Committee Against Torture (CAT) with briefings from the Committee's Vice Chair.

In October 2008, UNHCR listed the organization as having a staff of six. UN Watch had 110 members in 2007, geographically distributed as follows: 56% from Europe, 38% from North America, and 4% from Oceania. UN Watch's newsletter on UN issues now reaches nearly 5,000 subscribers around the world.

Commentary from the group has appeared in the BBC, Al Jazeera, Reuters, Washington Post, Agence France-Presse, Voice of America, The Jerusalem Post, Fox News, JTA, and others.

Board and funding
Current board members are:
Diego Arria, former Permanent Representative for Venezuela to the United Nations and President of the Security Council 
Jean-Claude Buhrer
Irwin Cotler, human rights advocate, former Canadian Member of Parliament, former Minister of Justice and Attorney General of Canada, Founder and Chair of the Raoul Wallenberg Centre for Human Rights.
Yang Jianli, Chinese dissident with United States residency and human rights activist
Garry Kasparov Russian dissident and former world chess champion
Mark P. Lagon political scientist and practitioner, Chief Policy Officer at Friends of the Global Fight Against AIDS, Tuberculosis, and Malaria and a Distinguished Senior Scholar at Georgetown University's School of Foreign Service.
Katrina Lantos Swett President of the Lantos Foundation, former Chair of the United States Commission on International Religious Freedom
David Trimble, former  first First Minister of Northern Ireland from 1998 to 2002 and the leader of the Ulster Unionist Party
Gert Weisskirchen, German politician and former Member of the Bundestag

Former board members include:
Per Ahlmark, former Deputy Prime Minister of Sweden
Max Jakobson, former Finnish Ambassador to the United Nations
David A. Harris, Executive Director of the American Jewish Committee
Ruth Wedgwood, Professor of International Law and Diplomacy, Johns Hopkins University
Alfred H. Moses, Attorney, former United States Ambassador to Romania and Presidential Emissary for the Cyprus Conflict, Special Counsel to President Jimmy Carter.

UN Watch is funded by private individual donations and charitable foundations.

Positions and activities

Regions

Congo
In 2008, the post of United Nations special rapporteur for the Congo was eliminated by the United Nations Human Rights Council. The elimination was done with the support of Egypt, Algeria, Tunisia, Russia and other countries, following a request by the Congolese administration of President Joseph Kabila. According to a subsequent report prepared by the office of UN Secretary General Ban Ki-moon, both government and rebel forces proceeded to carry out mass killings, rape and torture. In November of that year, UN Watch called on the UNHRC to apologize for abolishing the post, and stated that the UNHRC should be held to account for the move, given the atrocities people there were enduring. UN Watch Executive Director Hillel Neuer said in a statement, "Morally, those countries (on the Council) who were behind the elimination of the monitoring mandate in March ought now to apologise to the victims of Congo... We will never know how many lives could have been saved if the Council, deferring to Congo's government, had not caused this unconscionable protection gap which slashed an early-warning mechanism just when the victims needed it most." Other rights groups called for the reestablishment of the post.

On 1 December 2009, following atrocities in the eastern Congolese province of North Kivu, the UNHRC condemned abuses against civilians in Congo. UN Watch said it was hoping to see a reassignment of a UN rights expert to the region, and said abuses "making eastern Congo a living hell" needed to be properly investigated. UN Watch said a total of 50 groupings had signed the appeal to UN Secretary General Ban Ki-moon and human rights chief Navi Pillay, asking to restore the post of UN rights monitor there.

Darfur
UN Watch chaired the NGO Activist Summit For Darfur in 2007.

On 27 April 2008, UN Watch joined human rights organizations around the world in launching a "Justice for Darfur" campaign. The organizations behind the campaign included Amnesty International, Human Rights First and Human Rights Watch. The campaign called on the United Nations Security Council, regional organizations and national governments to pressure Sudan to cooperate with the International Criminal Court, and to arrest suspected war criminals Ali Kushayb and Ahmad Harun. The Sudanese government had refused to surrender either suspect to the Court, and had in fact promoted Harun to the position of State Minister for Humanitarian Affairs.

Iran
UN Watch commended the US, France and other democracies for their “forceful criticism” of Iran's human rights record at a UN hearing in Geneva's UN Human Rights Council (UNHRC) in February 2010. At the same time, UN Watch executive director Hillel Neuer cautioned that the outcome of the council session could be limited to a “toothless” report to be adopted.

Haiti
In the wake of the January 2010 Haiti earthquake, the UN Human Rights Council's 47 members unanimously passed a resolution that expressed concern about rights abuses in the wake of the quake and urged the government and aid groups to protect children from violence and exploitation. UN Watch slammed the UN Human Rights Council's two-day special session on Haiti as "a harmful waste of the organization's precious time, resources, and moral capital," adding that the council "has no budget, authority or expertise on humanitarian aid" and "ignores more pressing human rights problems".

Switzerland
Following Switzerland’s 2009 vote to ban minarets, UN Watch stated that it was particularly embarrassed by the fact and that it will work toward its repeal. The NGO's director Hillel Neuer said that banning of Muslim structures by a government is wrongful discrimination.

UNHRC elections
Along with Freedom House, UN Watch has opposed the candidacies of states with poor human rights records for the United Nations Human Rights Council. The 2006 UN resolution establishing the council requires that, in electing states to the panel, UN member states "shall take into account the contribution of candidates to the promotion and protection of human rights."

2007
In May 2007, UN Watch and Freedom House submitted a joint report on an election to the United Nations Human Rights Council, stating that candidates Angola, Belarus, Egypt and Qatar were unfit to sit on the human rights body, because they themselves violated rights. The report said that the four countries "are authoritarian regimes with negative UN voting records (on rights issues) and are not qualified to be Council members". The report further described candidates Slovenia, Denmark, Italy and the Netherlands as "well qualified" for the Council, and called candidates Bolivia, India, Indonesia, Madagascar, Nicaragua, the Philippines and South Africa as "questionable".

2009
In May 2009, UN Watch and Freedom House again submitted a joint report on a UNHRC election. The report described candidates China, Cuba and Saudi Arabia as "the worst of the worst" in terms of human rights. The report also described candidates Azerbaijan, Cameroon, Djibouti and Russia as "not qualified", and Bangladesh, Jordan, Kenya, Kyrgyzstan, Nigeria and Senegal as "questionable". UN Watch and Freedom House described the council's record for its first three years as poor. They stated that Islamic countries with Cuban support rewrote rules for a freedom of expression monitor in a manner that limits expression, and that an "alliance of regressive regimes" succeeded in having the Council cancel human rights investigators for trouble spots such as Belarus, Cuba, Liberia, the Democratic Republic of Congo and Darfur. In contrast, they said, the alliance led to the council appointing an investigator who was involved in founding a controversial human rights prize in honor of Muammar al-Gaddafi and another who believes that the 9/11 attacks were an inside job. Hillel Neuer said, "The vision had been that the council would be a voice for victims, but it is now in a state of crisis."

2010
UN Watch expressed alarm over a report that Asian countries might facilitate Iran’s election in May 2010 to the 47-member UNHRC.

2011

UN Watch is credited with leading the campaign to deny Syria's bid for a seat.

2014

UN Watch strongly condemned the 2014 elections of Saudi Arabia, China, Cuba, and Russia to the Human Rights Council. In an interview by France 24, executive director Hillel Neuer called this a “black day for human rights.”
A campaign to remove these countries from the body, "Dictator-free HRC" is ongoing along with a petition on the organization's website.

Other UN activities

Goldstone Report
UN Watch submitted a 29-page legal petition to the United Nations Fact Finding Mission on the Gaza Conflict requesting the recusal of member Christine Chinkin because she was one of 31 academics and lawyers who had co-signed a letter published in the Sunday Times before being selected for the mission that accused Israel of not complying with international humanitarian and human rights law. The letter described Israel's military offensive in Gaza as "an act of aggression", stating that "invasion and bombardment of Gaza amounts to collective punishment of Gaza's 1.5m inhabitants contrary to international humanitarian and human rights law", and adding that "the blockade of humanitarian relief, the destruction of civilian infrastructure, and preventing access to basic necessities such as food and fuel, are prima facie war crimes". UN Watch stated that, since Chinkin had already formed and expressed a judgment on the very issues the Mission was meant to investigate, she could not fulfill the impartiality requirement for fact-finding missions. The petition cites authorities of international law, including a 2004 precedent of the international tribunal for Sierra Leone, in which Justice Geoffrey Robertson was disqualified by his fellow judges over the appearance of bias.

The UN Watch request was covered by the Deutsche Presse Agentur and the Khaleej Times and Agence France Presse. UN Watch further noted that in a May 2009 meeting with Geneva NGOs, Chinkin denied that her impartiality was compromised, saying that her statement only addressed jus ad bellum, and not jus in bello; however, according to UN Watch, the statement not only determined that "Israel’s actions amount to aggression, not self-defence," but additionally charged that they were "contrary to international humanitarian and human rights law," and constituted "prima facie war crimes."

The inquiry members rejected the petition and said that the mission investigated whether Israel, Hamas or the Palestinian Authority had unnecessarily caused death or injury to innocent civilians by specific acts of armed conflict that violated international humanitarian law and international human rights law stating "On those issues the letter co-signed by Professor Chinkin expressed no view at all." The members further wrote in their reply that the fact-finding mission cannot be considered a judicial or even a quasi-judicial proceeding. Hillel Neuer, director of UN Watch, said that the arguments raised by the mission ignored the well-established set of standards to international fact-finding missions. Goldstone said that the letter signed by Chinkin could have been the grounds for disqualification, had the mission been a judicial inquiry.

UN anti-Israel bias and antisemitism

UN Watch is active at the UN in combating anti-Israel and anti-Semitism, and what it dubs the selective and politicized treatment of Israel by many UN bodies.  The group supported former Secretary General Kofi Annan's declared goal of ending the UN's imbalanced treatment of Israel and has been highly critical of the United Nations Human Rights Council. The Jewish Telegraphic Agency has described U.N. Watch as a pro-Israel organization.

March 2007 UNHRC speech
On 23 March 2007, UN Watch's Hillel Neuer delivered a harshly critical speech to the United Nations Human Rights Council (UNHRC), stating that the Council had betrayed the dreams of its founders and become "a nightmare". Neuer charged that the Council ignores human rights abuses worldwide, opting instead to enact "one resolution after another condemning one single state: Israel". He further argued that the Council's stated concern for Palestinian human rights is deceptive, and provided examples where it ignored atrocities against Palestinians "because Israel could not be blamed. … The despots who run this Council couldn’t care less about Palestinians, or about any human rights. They seek to demonize Israeli democracy, to delegitimize the Jewish state, to scapegoat the Jewish people."

Neuer's speech was praised in a number of editorials and op-eds. The Wall Street Journal opined that Neuer's candor disrupted the Council's "obfuscation" and "fraudulence". An op-ed writer in The National Post stated that the speech became "a major hit on YouTube". In its editorial, The New York Sun called it a rare "diplomatic moment to remember", and published the full text of his remarks. Alan Gold, an Australian human rights activist, opined Neuer's speech was "a non-government organisation laying bare the mendacity and prejudice of a key UN body."

Ian Williams, writing for The Guardian, accepted Neuer's points about the hypocritical double standards in the UN regarding Israel and several nations: Israel is the focus of censure, while criticism of many despotic countries is passed over. The hypocrisy however, he concludes, extends to UN Watch itself, whose credibility is, in his view, undermined by the organisation's failure to provide evidence that it has ever condemned 'manifest Israeli transgressions of the human rights of Palestinians.'

Other

Sexual exploitation
UN Watch, the World YWCA, and the World Alliance of YMCAs published a statement against sexual exploitation and child pornography. "Today far too many children are sexually exploited and abused causing lifelong damage. More than two million children are exploited in the multibillion-dollar sex industry each year and 1.2 million children are trafficked annually", the statement said.

Reception history
Former UN Secretary General Kofi Annan has said "I deeply appreciate the valuable work performed by UN Watch. I believe that informed and independent evaluation of the United Nations' activities will prove a vital source as we seek to adapt the Organization to the needs of a changing world." At the 2006 Centennial Anniversary of the American Jewish Committee, the Director-General of the UN Office in Geneva, Sergei Ordzhonikidze, praised the work of UN Watch by saying "allow me to also pay tribute to the valuable work of UN Watch in support of the just application of values and principles of the United Nations Charter and support for human rights for all."

Ian Williams, former president of the United Nations Correspondents Association and author of The UN For Beginners, wrote in an opinion piece in The Guardian in 2007 that the main objective of UN Watch "is to attack the United Nations in general, and its human rights council in particular, for alleged bias against Israel". Williams supported UN Watch's condemnation of the UN Human Rights Council as a hypocritical organization, but also accused UN Watch itself of hypocrisy for failing to denounce what he called "manifest Israeli transgressions against the human rights of Palestinians."

The New Republics Martin Peretz, in a 2007 blog piece, described the organization as "a truth-telling organization." Claudia Rosett, a journalist-in-residence with the conservative Foundation for Defense of Democracies, praised UN Watch as "stalwart and invaluable".

The American journalist and political activist Phyllis Bennis described UN Watch as a "small Geneva-based right-wing organisation" that is "hardly known outside of UN headquarters". She stressed that "undermining and delegitimising" Richard Falk through "scurrilous accusations" has been an "obsession of UN Watch" when he became Special Rapporteur.

Agence France-Presse has described UN Watch both as "a lobby group with strong ties to Israel" and as a group which "champion[s] human rights worldwide". The Economist has described UN Watch as a "pro-Israeli monitor".

References

Further reading
 Hillel Neuer of UN Watch interviewed on Shire Network News
 The Struggle against Anti-Israel Bias at the UN Commission on Human Rights – Hillel C. Neuer

External links
 Official website
 UN Watch, Institute for Policy Studies – Right Web, Tracking militarists’ efforts to influence U.S. foreign policy.

1993 establishments in Switzerland
Criticism of the United Nations
Human rights organisations based in Switzerland
Organisations based in Geneva
Organizations established in 1993
United Nations relations